Malcolm Pringle is a paralympic athlete from South Africa competing mainly in category T38 sprint and middle-distance events.

Malcolm competed in three Paralympics in 1996, 2000 and 2004.  In each games he won the gold medal in the 800m.  In the 1996 games he also won silvers in the 1500m and 400m.  In the 2000 games he won a bronze in the 400m and competed as part of the South Africa 4 × 100 m team.  In his final games he won his second 400m silver as well as competing in the 200m and the 4 × 100 m.

References

Paralympic athletes of South Africa
Athletes (track and field) at the 1996 Summer Paralympics
Athletes (track and field) at the 2000 Summer Paralympics
Athletes (track and field) at the 2004 Summer Paralympics
Paralympic gold medalists for South Africa
Paralympic silver medalists for South Africa
Paralympic bronze medalists for South Africa
Living people
World record holders in Paralympic athletics
Medalists at the 1996 Summer Paralympics
Medalists at the 2000 Summer Paralympics
Medalists at the 2004 Summer Paralympics
Year of birth missing (living people)
Paralympic medalists in athletics (track and field)
South African male middle-distance runners
20th-century South African people
21st-century South African people